The 2015 ICC Americas Twenty20 Division One was a cricket tournament held in the United States from 3–10 May 2015. All matches were played at the World Sports Park in Indianapolis, Indiana.

The top two teams at the tournament, Canada and the United States, progressed to the 2015 World Twenty20 Qualifier in Ireland and Scotland, where the top six teams will qualify for the 2016 ICC World Twenty20 in India. The tournament was organised by ICC Americas, and featured the top four associate members in that region – Bermuda, Canada, Suriname, and the United States. The West Indies cricket team is a full member of the International Cricket Council (ICC), and thus qualifies directly for the World Twenty20.

Teams and qualification

Squads

 Japen Patel was initially named in the U.S. squad for the tournament, but withdrew in late April, and was replaced by Mrunal Patel.
 Fiqre Crockwell and Malachi Jones were initially named in Bermuda's squad for the tournament, but withdrew in late April (Jones due to injury and Crockwell for unnamed reasons), and were replaced by Jason Anderson and Jacobi Robinson. Anderson himself was withdrawn from the squad before the start of the tournament, and replaced by Mishael Paynter.
 Nisarg Patel was declared by the ICC to be ineligible to play in the tournament.

Preparation
The Americas Twenty20 is the first international tournament to be held at the Indianapolis World Sports Park, with the two previous editions having been held at the Central Broward Regional Park in Lauderhill, Florida. Bermuda, coached by former national player Arnold Manders (assisted by a former teammate, Clay Smith), prepared for the tournament with a training camp in Jamaica. There, they played three matches against Jamaican club sides, winning all three. As part of its preparation for the tournament, Suriname played several Twenty20 matches against a touring Marylebone Cricket Club (MCC) side in March 2015. Canada played three warm-up matches against an invitational XI in Houston, Texas.

Points table

Fixtures

Statistics

Most runs
The top five run scorers (total runs) are included in this table.

Source: CricHQ

Most wickets

The top five wicket takers (total wickets) are listed in this table, ranked by wickets taken and then by bowling average.

Source: CricHQ

Final standing

References

External links
 Series home at ESPN Cricinfo

2015 in sports in Indiana
2016 ICC World Twenty20
Sports competitions in Indianapolis
International cricket competitions in 2015
International cricket competitions in the United States